The lateral antebrachial cutaneous nerve (or lateral cutaneous nerve of forearm) is a sensory nerve representing the continuation of the musculocutaneous nerve beyond the lateral edge of the tendon of the biceps brachii muscle. The lateral antebrachial cutaneous nerve provides sensory innervation to the skin of the lateral forearm. It pierces the deep fascia of forearm to enter the subcutaneous compartment before splitting into a volar branch and a dorsal branch.

Anatomy

Course and relations 
It passes behind the cephalic vein and divides opposite the elbow-joint into a volar branch and a dorsal branch.

Branches

Volar branch 
The volar branch (ramus volaris; anterior branch) descends along the radial border of the forearm to the wrist, and supplies the skin over the lateral half of its volar surface.

At the wrist-joint it is placed in front of the radial artery, and some filaments, piercing the deep fascia, accompany that vessel to the dorsal surface of the carpus.

The nerve then passes downward to the ball of the thumb, where it ends in cutaneous filaments.

It communicates with the superficial branch of the radial nerve, and with the palmar cutaneous branch of the median nerve.

Dorsal branch 
The dorsal branch (ramus dorsalis; posterior branch) descends, along the dorsal surface of the radial side of the forearm to the wrist.

It supplies the skin of the lower two-thirds of the dorso-lateral surface of the forearm, communicating with the superficial branch of the radial nerve and the dorsal antebrachial cutaneous branch of the radial nerve.

See also
 Medial cutaneous nerve of forearm
 Posterior cutaneous nerve of forearm
 Superior lateral cutaneous nerve of arm

Additional images

References

External links
 
 , 
 
  - "Cutaneous nerves of the upper extremity."
 

Nerves of the upper limb